Big Walnuts Yonder is an American indie rock supergroup formed in 2008. The band consists of bassist/vocalist Mike Watt from Minutemen, guitarist Nels Cline from Wilco, drummer Greg Saunier from Deerhoof, and guitarist/vocalist Nick Reinhart from Tera Melos. Big Walnuts Yonder's self-titled debut album was released on May 5, 2017 via Sargent House.

History
Watt's band The Missingmen and Reinhart's band Tera Melos were both in Ireland at the same time and the two got to talking backstage. Reinhart inquired about Watt's album Contemplating the Engine Room and expressed admiration for Nels Cline's work on it which inspired Watt to suggest the three of them ‘start a proj’. Reinhart suggested Greg Saunier to fill the drummer position to which Watt quickly agreed. It took two years for all four members to get their schedules aligned to start recording what became their first album, Big Walnuts Yonder. Although the album was recorded in 2014, it wasn't released until 2017.

Discography

Albums
 Big Walnuts Yonder (2017)

Singles
 "Raise the Drawbridges?" (2017)
 "Sponge Bath" (2017)

References

External links
Big Walnuts Yonder

Indie rock musical groups from New York (state)
Mike Watt
Musical groups established in 2008
Musical groups from Brooklyn
Musical groups from New York (state)
Musical quartets
Rock music supergroups
2008 establishments in New York City